The 100 mm vz. 53 was a dual-purpose field gun and anti-tank gun designed and produced for the Czechoslovak Army during the 1950s.

History 
When Czechoslovakia was created with the dissolution of Austro-Hungarian Empire after World War I it inherited a large and capable arms manufacturing industry.  This allowed the new state to both design and produce its own weapons for domestic use and for export.  After World War II this design and manufacturing experience allowed Czechoslovakia to not only produce Soviet designs under license but to produce equipment for its own use and for export to its Warsaw Pact allies.  A consequence of its membership in the Warsaw Pact was that the military hardware it produced used Soviet caliber ammunition.  This standardization was also pursued by NATO members, but with their own calibers of ammunition.

Design 
Design and development of the vz. 53 began in 1948 at the Škoda Works in Pilsen under the company designation of A20.  Problems with the design of ammunition lead to production being discontinued in 1950.  It wasn't until 1953 that the problems were resolved and development resumed with designation vz.53.  The vz.53 was designed to fill the same roles as the Soviet 100 mm field gun M1944 (BS-3) and used the same ammunition.  Its performance was similar to that of the M1944 but since it was a unique design it had different dimensions.  For night fighting it could be fitted with an infra-red sight.

Similarities
 Fixed QF 100 x 695 mm R ammunition
 Split-trail carriage
 Semi-automatic vertical sliding-wedge breech
 Gun shield
 Hydro-pneumatic recoil system
 Double-baffle muzzle brake
Differences
 Weight
 Length
 Barrel length
 Single tires
 Elevation
 Traverse

References

100 mm artillery
Artillery of Czechoslovakia
Anti-tank guns of the Cold War
Field artillery of the Cold War
Military equipment introduced in the 1950s